This article lists the albums and singles attributed to the anime series The Big O.

Soundtrack albums

The Big O: Original Sound Score 

The Big O: Original Sound Score is the first soundtrack album of The Big O, released by Victor Entertainment on November 20, 1999. It contains the background music composed by Toshihiko Sahashi for the series' first season, plus the TV size versions of the opening and ending themes.

Track listing

The Big O: Original Sound Score II for Second Season 

The Big O: Original Sound Score II for Second Season is the first soundtrack album of The Big O, released by Victor Entertainment on January 22, 2003. It contains the background music composed by Toshihiko Sahashi for the series' second season, plus remixes of background music tracks from both seasons. The remixes are named after New York City streets.

Track listing

Singles

The Big O

The Big O is the first single for the anime series of the same name, released by Victor Entertainment on October 21, 1999. It features the opening theme "Big-O!" by Rui Nagai and the ending theme "And Forever..." by Robbie Danzie with Naoki Takao.

Track listing

"Respect"

"Respect" is the second single for the anime series The Big O, released by Victor Entertainment on January 3, 2003. It features the second season opening theme by Toshihiko Sahashi, plus the re-release of the original opening theme "Big-O!" by Rui Nagai and the ending theme "And Forever..." by Robbie Danzie with Naoki Takao.

Track listing

Footnotes

References

External links
The Big O: Original Sound Score
 
 

The Big O: Original Sound Score II for Second Season
 
 
 

The Big O single
 

"Respect" single
 

1999 soundtrack albums
2003 soundtrack albums
Anime soundtracks
The Big O
Victor Entertainment soundtracks